Daniele Masala (born 12 February 1955) is an Italian modern pentathlete and Olympic champion.

Biography
Masala first participated at the Olympics in 1976. Eight years later, he was on the Italian team which won a gold medal at the 1984 Summer Olympics in Los Angeles. He also received the individual gold medal. At the 1988 Summer Olympics in Seoul he received a team silver medal.

Achievements

References

External links
 
 
 

1955 births
Living people
Italian male modern pentathletes
Olympic modern pentathletes of Italy
Modern pentathletes at the 1976 Summer Olympics
Modern pentathletes at the 1984 Summer Olympics
Modern pentathletes at the 1988 Summer Olympics
Olympic gold medalists for Italy
Olympic silver medalists for Italy
Olympic medalists in modern pentathlon
World Modern Pentathlon Championships medalists
Medalists at the 1988 Summer Olympics
Medalists at the 1984 Summer Olympics
Modern pentathletes of Fiamme Oro
20th-century Italian people